Omiltemia is a genus of flowering plants belonging to the family Rubiaceae.

Its native range is Southwestern Mexico.

Species
Species:

Omiltemia guerrerensis 
Omiltemia longipes 
Omiltemia parvifolia

References

Rubiaceae
Rubiaceae genera